James New Stubbs (October 17, 1839 – April 10, 1919) was an American politician who served in the Virginia House of Delegates.

References

External links 

1839 births
1919 deaths
Members of the Virginia House of Delegates
19th-century American politicians
20th-century American politicians